Chaney High School is a public high school in Youngstown, Ohio, United States. It is one of four secondary schools in the Youngstown City School District. Athletic teams compete as the Chaney Cowboys and Cowgirls in the Ohio High School Athletic Association.

In 2011, Chaney High School was closed into a vocal Performing Arts school as well as a STEM fields school as part of a restructure by the school district. However, in 2017, it was announced by Youngstown City School District CEO Krish Mohip that Chaney High School would return to a traditional structure as part of the entire district being reconfigured into neighborhood schooling.

Sports

History
In its first incarnation, Chaney offered baseball, basketball, bowling, football, and track for boys as well as basketball, bowling, cheerleading, softball, volleyball, and track were sponsored for girls.

Although the football team never won a state title (their best finish was a loss in the Division-III state championship game in 1997), Chaney produced several college standouts and NFL athletes, such as former Heisman Trophy winner and NFL MVP Frank Sinkwich, Jerry Olsavsky, Mike Zordich, Matt Cavanaugh, Anthony Floyd, Brad Smith and Keilen Dykes.

Chaney football also won more city titles than any other school prior to the 2006–07 school year when the Youngstown City Series dissolved. The Chaney football team was on hiatus from 2011 until 2018.

Notable alumni
 Thomas Bopp, amateur astronomer and co-discoverer of Comet Hale–Bopp, Class of 1967
 Frank Sinkwich, 1942 Heisman Trophy winner of the University of Georgia

References

External links

"A day at Chaney." The Vindicator. Sunday, January 30, 2011.

Education in Youngstown, Ohio
High schools in Mahoning County, Ohio
Public high schools in Ohio
Public middle schools in Ohio